The  superyacht Joy was launched at the Feadship yard at the Kaag Island. She was designed by Bannenberg & Rowell Design, and the interior design was created by Studio Indigo.

She is available as a charter yacht.

Design 
The hull is built out of steel while the superstructure is made out of aluminium with teak laid decks. The yacht is classed by Lloyd's Register and registered in the Cayman Islands.

Key features 
Wellness facilities, beach club/disco, BBQ, SeaBobs, Jetsurf,  inflatable slide, inflatable kayaks, trampoline, wakeboard, waterskis & tows, snorkelling and diving gear, fishing gear, games deck, elevator, Jacuzzi, gym, zero speed stabilisers and one  Wajer 38 tender. She is powered by twin 1,850 hp MTU 12V4000 M53 engines.

See also
 List of motor yachts by length
 List of yachts built by Feadship

References

2016 ships
Motor yachts
Ships built in the Netherlands